Cleveland Davidson (born 14 July 1960) is a Jamaican cricketer. He played in 47 first-class and 32 List A matches for the Jamaican cricket team from 1982 to 1994.

See also
 List of Jamaican representative cricketers

References

External links
 

1960 births
Living people
Jamaican cricketers
Jamaica cricketers
People from Westmoreland Parish